The 1947–48 New Hampshire Wildcats men's ice hockey season was the 21st season of play for the program but first under the oversight of the NCAA. The Wildcats represented the University of New Hampshire and were coached by Joseph Petroski, in his 1st season.

Season
With new coach Pat Petroski in charge, the weather generously turned cold in December, allowing the team plenty of time to practice before their first game. Unfortunately, they were easily bested in their first game. Upon returning home, the hard work began to show when they lost a close decision to Northeastern and then followed that up with their first win of the year. The UNH defense, led by Tom Kelly, didn't acquit itself well in a pair of losses to fairly weak competition but by the end of the month they had coalesced into a serviceable group. Following a good showing against Boston University, the Wildcats got their revenge over the Huskies with an 8–5 win. After a second loss to BU, UNH knocked off Norwich to put themselves into contention for the inaugural NEIHL tournament. While their chances weren't good, any hope they had was erased when MIT won the rematch game and UNH sputtered to the finish.

The weather, which had been good throughout January, turned on February 10 and the Wildcats found it difficult to practice thereafter.

Roster

Standings

Schedule and results

|-
!colspan=12 style=";" | Regular Season

Scoring statistics

Note: Only sparse goaltending statistics are available.

References

New Hampshire Wildcats men's ice hockey seasons
New Hampshire
New Hampshire
New Hampshire